Logan County Schools is the operating school district within Logan County, West Virginia. It is governed by the Logan County Board of Education.

Schools

Elementary Schools 

 Buffalo Elementary School
 Chapmanville Primary School
 Chapmanville Intermediate
 Holden Central Elementary School
 Hugh Dingess Elementary School
 Justice Elementary School
 Logan Elementary School
 Man Elementary School
 Omar Elementary School
 South Man Elementary School
 Verdunville Elementary School

Middle Schools 

 Chapmanville Middle School
 Logan Middle School
 Man Middle School

High Schools 
Logan High School
Chapmanville Regional High School
Man High School
Ralph R. Willis Career and Technical Center

References

External links
 Logan County Schools

School districts in West Virginia
Education in Logan County, West Virginia